Vermont's 6th congressional district is an obsolete district.

History 
Only during a single decade (1813 to 1823), did Vermont have six seats in the United States House of Representatives.

For the first four congresses of that decade (the 13th through 16th Congresses, lasting from 1813 through 1821), Vermont's six members of the House were elected at-large.  For the 17th and final Congress of that apportionment (lasting from 1821 through 1823), Vermont elected its representatives from geographical districts.  After the Census of 1820, Vermont lost one seat and went back to at-large members.

Vermont has not had six seats since 1823.

List of member representing the district

References

Cite Book 

 Congressional Biographical Directory of the United States 1774–present

06
Former congressional districts of the United States
1821 establishments in Vermont
1823 disestablishments in Vermont
Constituencies established in 1821
Constituencies disestablished in 1823